The 1959 Miami Hurricanes football team represented the University of Miami as an independent during the 1959 NCAA University Division football season. Led by 12th-year head coach Andy Gustafson, the Hurricanes played their home games at the Miami Orange Bowl in Miami, Florida. Miami finished the season 6–4.

Schedule

Roster
QB Fran Curci
Jim Otto, Sr.

References

Miami
Miami Hurricanes football seasons
Miami Hurricanes football